The 2022–23 season is Hereford's eight season since forming as a phoenix club after the demise of Hereford United in 2014. The club are competing in the National League North for the fifth consecutive season following their 12th-placed finish in the previous season.

First-team squad 
 As of 4 March 2023

Transfers

Transfers in

Transfers out

Loans in

Loans out

Pre-season

Competitions

Overview

National League North

League table

Results summary

Results by round

Matches 

Source: Flashscore.co.uk

FA Cup 

Hereford entered the competition in the second qualifying round.

Source: Flashscore.co.uk

FA Trophy 

Hereford entered the competition in the second round.

Source: Flashscore.co.uk

HFA County Challenge Cup 

Source: The FA

Squad statistics 
 As of match played 18 March 2023

Goals

References 

Hereford F.C.